Hemerocoetes is a genus of duckbill fishes.

References 

Percophidae
Extant Rupelian first appearances
Marine fish genera
Taxa named by Achille Valenciennes
Rupelian genus first appearances